Ellery Bop were a 1980s indie rock band with Liverpool and Irish roots.

Lineup
 Jamie Farrell : vocalist/lead guitarist 
 
 Robbie Butcher : bass guitar
 Kev Connolly : percussion
 Mark Parry : drums

Career
The band toured infrequently (with Killing Joke) but recorded several sessions for the BBC with John Peel and Janice Long. A John Peel session was recorded live at the London I.C.A. The band claimed bands such as MC5, The Stooges, Ramones, Heartbreakers and The Clash as their influences.

Discography
Chart placings shown are from the UK Indie Chart.

Singles
"Hit the Moon" (June 1981) 
"Ringing" (March 1982) (featuring; Ian Broudie of the Lightning Seeds on bass) (No. 46)
"We Deny" (November 1982) 
Fire in Reflection EP (1983)
Torn Apart EP  (1985)
"Ellery Bop - Torn Apart" (music video 1985)

References

English indie rock groups
Musical groups from Liverpool